Mark James Ricketts (born 7 October 1984) is an English football defender who plays for National League club Boreham Wood. He previously played in the Football League for Milton Keynes Dons.

Career
Born in Sidcup, Ricketts began his career at Charlton Athletic in 2000 but made no appearances for the first team. He had a loan spell at League One club Milton Keynes Dons in the 2005–06 season. He made his debut in the FA Cup first-round tie at Lincoln City, and played twice more before suffering a knee ligament injury. Despite the injury, his loan spell was extended for a second and third month, and he made seven league and cup appearances for MK Dons.

At the end of the season, he was released by Charlton after the club decided not to offer him a new contract, and joined Gravesend and Northfleet in August 2006. He made 31 appearances in the 2006–07 season, and his performances were rewarded by the newly renamed Ebbsfleet United with a new contract in May 2007. A knee injury that required surgery interrupted the beginning of Ricketts' 2007–08 season, but he returned to the side at the end of September 2007 and went on to make 30 appearances that season. He was put on standby for the England C squad in February 2008, and collected a winners' medal when Ebbsfleet won the FA Trophy at Wembley Stadium in May 2008. He signed a new contract in June 2008.

In June 2009, Ricketts signed for Conference South club Woking. In 2010, Ricketts was made club captain. Ricketts quickly became a fan favourite at Woking and went on to make over 200 league appearances before leaving in June 2016.

On 10 June 2016, Ricketts joined National League rival Boreham Wood on a free transfer. On 6 August 2016, Ricketts made his Boreham Wood debut in a 1–0 victory over Forest Green Rovers, playing the full 90 minutes.

On 6 February 2022, Ricketts scored Boreham Wood's only goal in a 1–0 shock away win against Bournemouth in the FA Cup fourth round.

Career statistics

Honours
Ebbsfleet United
FA Trophy: 2007–08

Woking
Conference South: 2011–12

References

External links

1984 births
Living people
Footballers from Sidcup
English footballers
Association football defenders
Association football midfielders
Charlton Athletic F.C. players
Milton Keynes Dons F.C. players
Ebbsfleet United F.C. players
Woking F.C. players
Boreham Wood F.C. players
English Football League players
National League (English football) players